This is a list of sheriffs and since 1998 high sheriffs of Worcestershire.

The Sheriff is the oldest secular office under the Crown.  Formerly the Sheriff was the principal law enforcement officer in the county but over the centuries most of the responsibilities associated with the post have been transferred elsewhere or are now defunct, so that its functions are now largely ceremonial. Under the provisions of the Local Government Act 1972, on 1 April 1974 the office previously known as Sheriff was retitled High Sheriff.

Under the same act Herefordshire and Worcestershire were merged to form the new county of Hereford and Worcester, therefore the office of Sheriff of Worcestershire was replaced by that of High Sheriff of Hereford and Worcester. However, in 1998 the new county was dissolved, restoring Herefordshire and Worcestershire and creating the offices of High Sheriff of Herefordshire and High Sheriff of Worcestershire.

Medieval

Early Norman

Henry II (25 October 1154 – 6 July 1189)
 Source: Thomas Fuller’s Worthies of England; Rev George Miller, The Parishes of the Diocese of Worcester

Richard I 6 July 1189 – 6 April 1199
 Source: Thomas Fuller’s Worthies of England

John 1199–1216
 Source: Thomas Fuller’s Worthies of England

Henry III 1216–1272
 Source: Thomas Fuller’s Worthies of England

Edward I 1272–1307
 Source: Thomas Fuller’s Worthies of England

 William de Bello Campo Comes Warwick 1–26
 Guido de Bello Campo 27–35

Edward II 7 July 1307 – 25 January 1327
 Source: Thomas Fuller’s Worthies of England

 Guido de Bello Campo, Comes Warwick and Robert de Berkenhall
 Guido de Bello Campo, Comes Warwick and Walter de Perthrope 2–5
 Guido de Bello Campo, and Robert de Warwick 6–7
 Guido de Bello Campo 8
 Johan de Hernyold 9
 Walter de Bello Campo 10–11
 William Stracy 12–14
 William de Bello Campo 15–16
 Nicholas Russell 17–18
 Walter de Kokesey 19

Edward III 25 January 1327 – 1377
 Source: Thomas Fuller’s Worthies of England

Richard II 1377–99
 Source: Thomas Fuller’s Worthies of England

Henry IV Bolingbroke 30 September 1399 – 1413
 Source: Thomas Fuller’s Worthies of England

Henry V 20 March 1413 – 1422
 Source: Thomas Fuller’s Worthies of England

Henry VI
 Richard de Bello Campo 1–15 
 Norman Washburne, Subvice 16 
 Henry Beauchamp 18 
 Thomas Lyttelton 26 
 Richard Nevyle 28

Edward IV (first reign) 4 March 1461 – 2 October 1470
 Gualterus Skull 12 

 James Radclyffe 20

Richard III 26 June 1483 – 1485
 Source: Thomas Fuller’s Worthies of England

Henry VII 22 August 1485 – 1509
 Source: Thomas Fuller’s Worthies of England
 Humphrey Stafford 

John Savage II, mil.13-24

Early modern

Henry VIII 21 April 1509 – 1547
 Source: Thomas Fuller’s Worthies of England

Edward VI 28 January 1547 – 1553
 Source: Thomas Fuller’s Worthies of England

Mary I 19 July 1553 – 1558
 Source: Thomas Fuller’s Worthies of England

Elizabeth I 1558 – 1603
 Source: Thomas Fuller’s Worthies of England

James I 24 March 1603 – 1625
 Source: Thomas Fuller’s Worthies of England

Charles I (1625–49)
 Source: Thomas Fuller’s Worthies of England

17th century

18th century

19th century

20th century

21st century

References

Secondary sources

External links 

 
Worcestershire
Local government in Worcestershire
Worcestershire-related lists